Darreh-ye Mari Shabliz (also Romanized as Darreh-ye Mārī Shablīz) is a village in Pataveh Rural District, Pataveh District, Dana County, Kohgiluyeh and Boyer-Ahmad Province, Iran. At the 2006 census, its population was 26, in 5 families.

References 

Populated places in Dana County